Vareilles is a commune in the Creuse department in the Nouvelle-Aquitaine region in central France.

Geography

The Benaize river flows through the commune and forms part of its western border.

Population

Sights
 The church of St. Pardoux, dating from the twelfth century.
 The remains of a fifteenth-century manorhouse at Montlebeau.

See also
Communes of the Creuse department

References

Communes of Creuse